Paul Butler (1892–1981) was an American heir, businessman and polo player.

Biography

Early life
Paul Butler was born on June 23, 1892 in Chicago, Illinois. He is a descendant of the Butler family of Ireland, headed by the Duke of Ormond. In 1654, his ancestor William Butler fled the British Isles because of Oliver Cromwell and settled in Ipswich, Massachusetts. His grandfather, Julius Butler, was the founder of the Butler Paper Company in Chicago in 1841. He also had a brother named Julius. He graduated from the University of Illinois at Urbana–Champaign. He served as a Lieutenant during the First World War.

Business
He served as President of his family business, the Butler Paper Company, from 1930 to 1965. By then, the company had diversified in paper, real estate and development. From 1960 to 1965, he served as President of the Nekoosa-Edwards Paper Company. He was a founder of Oak Brook, Illinois, including the Bank of Oak Brook and the Oak Brook Public Utilities Company. He also founded the Butler National Golf Club. In 1945, he founded the Butler Aviation Corporation, the largest aviation company in the United States. 

In 1951 he was named head of the Defense Air Transportation Administration, a then newly formed government agency to coordinate aviation facilities and equipment for defense.

He was a member of the General Society of Colonial Wars, the Chicago Historical Society, the Chicago Art Institute and the Chicago Museum of Natural History, and the Bath & Tennis and the Everglades Clubs in Palm Beach.

Polo
He won six U.S. Open Polo Championships and four Butler Handicap titles.

On October 31, 1924, he chartered the Oak Brook Polo Club with. In 1922, Paul and his father F.O. Butler registered the Oak Brook Polo Club with the United States Polo Association (USPA), making the club the fourth oldest in the United States. He served on the Board of Governors of the Palm Beach Polo and Country Club. He also served on the Board of Governors of the USPA for many years. He was a member of the Meadowbrook Polo Club. When the Meadowbrook Club was taken over by golfers some time after World War II, the Governors of the USPA came to Oak Brook to meet with Pau hat in hand to ask him to host the U.S.Open at Oak Brook, which by then had 12 polo fields, the 13th having been retired to a horseshow grounds as it was too small for a regulation size polo field, which is 10 acres. Paul and his family agreed to host the Open, and it was held in Oak Brook for 23 of 25 years between 1954 and 1978. During that time the polo and the entire Oak Brook Sports Corp, as the Butler's soak Brook land holdings were known, was managed by either Butler's daughter Jorie, or his son Michael. Jorie managed it all from 1968 until the early 1980s. (source Reute Butler)

He was inducted in the Museum of Polo and Hall of Fame on March 3, 1995.

Personal life
He was married three times, to Sarah Anne Josephine Rooney, Marjorie von Stresenreuter (later Mrs William Dunaway) and Jean Buckley.
 Michael Butler, a theatrical producer and businessman, whi=o is father of Adam, and grandfather of Liam; and Frank Osgood Butler II. He also had a daughter, Jorie Butler Kent, and Jorie has a daughter, Reute Butler.

Death
Butler was killed on June 24, 1981, one day after his 89th birthday, when he was struck by a car in front of his home in Oak Brook. Butler had walked out in front of his home at 1000 Oak Brook Road, at dusk, possibly to take photographs. He may have been standing in the middle of the street when he was hit by a driver. At the time, his net worth was estimated at "between $50 million and $125 million". The man who killed Butler had ironically been at a bar in the Oakbrook Shopping Center celebrating his own upcoming nuptials.  The family believes Paul was actually crossing the street to take photographs at a friend's daughter's birthday party, says his granddaughter Reute Butler.

References

1892 births
1981 deaths
20th-century American businesspeople
American polo players
Businesspeople from Chicago
People from Oak Brook, Illinois
University of Illinois Urbana-Champaign alumni